Dil Ishq (lit:"Heart Love"), is a Pakistani Romantic TV serial, directed by Syed Ali Raza Usama of Bashar Momin and written by Azeena Syed under the production house of  Babar Javed. It stars Aijaz Aslam, Neelam Muneer, Ayesha Khan and Ali Abbas (actor) in lead roles. Drama was aired after Eid Ul Fitr on 22 July 2015.

It was released on Amazon Prime on 17 August 2020.

Cast
Aijaz Aslam
Ayesha Khan
Neelam Muneer
Shamim Hilaly
Sohail Asghar
Shabbir Jan
Parveen Akbar
Ayesha Khan as Ama Jaan
Kamran Jeelani
Amir Qureshi
Ayesha Toor
Ali Abbas

References

2010s Pakistani television series